The Tennessee Historical Society is a historical society for the U.S. state of Tennessee. It was established in 1849. Its founding president from 1849 to 1856 was Nathaniel Cross, a Princeton-educated professor of Ancient Languages at the University of Nashville.

References

1849 establishments in Tennessee
Historical societies in Tennessee